Domnom-lès-Dieuze (literally Domnom near Dieuze) is a commune in the Moselle department in Grand Est in north-eastern France.

Prior to 1 July 1994, it was known as Domnon-lès-Dieuze.

See also
 Communes of the Moselle department

References

External links
 

Domnomlesdieuze